This is a list of diplomatic missions of Ecuador, excluding honorary consulates.

Africa 

 Cairo (Embassy)

 Pretoria (Embassy)

Americas 

 Buenos Aires (Embassy)

 La Paz (Embassy)

Brasília (Embassy)
São Paulo (Consulate)

Ottawa (Embassy)
Toronto (Consulate-General)

 Santiago (Embassy)

 Bogotá (Embassy)
 Ipiales (Consulate)

 San José (Embassy)

 Havana (Embassy)

 Santo Domingo (Embassy)

 San Salvador (Embassy)

 Guatemala City (Embassy)

 Tegucigalpa (Embassy)

Mexico City (Embassy)
 Monterrey (Consulate)

 Panama City (Embassy)

 Asunción (Embassy)

 Lima (Embassy)
 Tumbes (Consulate)

 Washington, D.C. (Embassy)
 Atlanta (Consulate-General)
 Chicago (Consulate-General)
 Houston (Consulate-General)
 Los Angeles (Consulate-General)
 Miami (Consulate-General)
 Minneapolis (Consulate-General)
 New Haven (Consulate-General)
 New York (Consulate-General)
 Newark (Consulate-General)
 Phoenix (Consulate-General)
 Woodside (Consulate-General)

 Montevideo (Embassy)

 Caracas (Embassy)

Asia 

 Beijing (Embassy)
 Guangzhou (Consulate-General)
 Shanghai (Consulate-General)

New Delhi (Embassy)

 Jakarta (Embassy)

 Tel Aviv (Embassy)

 Tokyo (Embassy)

 Ramallah (Embassy office)

 Doha (Embassy)

 Seoul (Embassy)

 Ankara (Embassy)

Europe 

 Vienna (Embassy)

 Brussels (Embassy) 

 Paris (Embassy)

 Berlin (Embassy)
 Hamburg (Consulate-General)

 Rome (Embassy)

 Budapest (Embassy) 

 Rome (Embassy)
 Genoa (Consulate-General)
 Milan (Consulate-General)

 The Hague (Embassy)

 Moscow (Embassy)

 Madrid (Embassy)
 Barcelona (Consulate-General)
 Málaga (Consulate-General)
 Murcia (Consulate-General)
 Palma de Mallorca (Consulate-General)
 Valencia (Consulate-General)

 Stockholm (Embassy) 

 Bern (Embassy)

 London (Embassy)

Oceania 

 Canberra (Embassy)

Multilateral organizations 
 Brussels (Mission to the European Union)
 Geneva (Permanent Mission to the United Nations and other International Organizations)
 Montevideo (Permanent Missions to ALADI and MERCOSUR)
 New York (Permanent Mission to the United Nations)
 Paris (Permanent Mission to UNESCO)
 Rome (Permanent Mission to FAO)
 Washington, D.C. (Permanent Mission to the OAS)

Gallery

Closed missions

Africa

Americas

Asia

Europe

See also 
 Foreign relations of Ecuador
 List of diplomatic missions in Ecuador
 Visa policy of Ecuador

Notes

References

External links

 Ministry of Foreign Affairs of Ecuador
 Embassy of Ecuador in London

Ecuador
Diplomatic missions